Many representatives of the news media reporting on the aftermath of Hurricane Katrina became directly involved in the unfolding events, instead of simply reporting. Due to the loss of most means of communication, such as land-based and cellular telephone systems, field reporters in many cases became conduits for information between victims and authorities.

Media involvement

Several reporters for various news agencies located groups of stranded victims, and reported their location via satellite uplink. Authorities, who monitored the network news broadcasts, would then attempt to coordinate rescue efforts based on the news reports. This was best illustrated when Shepard Smith and Geraldo Rivera of Fox News, among others, reported thousands of people stranded at the Ernest N. Morial Convention Center. Rivera tearfully pleaded for authorities to either send help or let the people leave. Geraldo Rivera went so far as to compare the convention center to Willowbrook State School.

Many journalists also contributed to the spread of false rumors of lawlessness among the victims, which many have been interpreted as an instance of yellow journalism. Many news organizations carried the unsubstantiated accounts that murder and rape were widespread, and in some cases later repeated the claims as fact, without attribution. However, only one actual report of a raping occurred during the uproar. A few of the reports of rape and violence were based on statements made by New Orleans city officials, including the Chief of Police. Many officials later claimed these rumors often impeded the relief and rescue efforts.

For some, the hurricane was a career-defining event.  For example, Vanity Fair qualified Brian Williams' (of NBC) work regarding Katrina as “Murrow-worthy” and reported that during the hurricane he became “a nation’s anchor.” The New York Times characterised William's reporting of the hurricane as “a defining moment.”[20]  Later, questions were raised about this reporting by the Times-Picayune of New Orleans.

Some issues of racial bias in media coverage began to surface as Caucasian flood victims were portrayed in one Agence France-Presse photo as "finding" supplies, while a black person was described in an Associated Press photo as "looting" supplies. The photographers later clarified the two stories, one claiming he witnessed the black person looting a flooded store, while the other photographer described the white people as finding the food floating in floodwaters. The image was widely reused on the internet in various modified forms, and was known as "Lootie". This was also criticized as an example of pervasive racism.

Media reporting also included coverage of political and religious leaders who suggested that the hurricane which killed 1,836 people was sent as a divine retribution for the sins of New Orleans, or of the South, or for the United States as a whole.

The news media, both traditional and Internet, also played a role in helping families locate missing loved ones. Many family members, unable to contact local authorities in the affected areas, discovered the fate of a loved one via an online photo or television video clip. In one instance, a family in Clearwater, Florida discovered their mother was still alive in Bay St. Louis, Mississippi after seeing a photo of her on TampaBayStart.com, a regional news site.

The storm also brought a dramatic rise in the role of Internet sites—especially blogging and community journalism. One example was the effort of NOLA.com, the web affiliate of New Orleans' Times-Picayune, which was awarded the Breaking News Pulitzer Prize, and shared the Public Service Pulitzer with the Biloxi-based Sun Herald. The newspaper's coverage was carried for days only on NOLA's blogs, as the newspaper lost its presses and evacuated its building as water rose around it on August 30. The site became an international focal point for news by local media, and also became a vital link for rescue operations and later for reuniting scattered residents, as it accepted and posted thousands of individual pleas for rescue on its blogs and forums. NOLA was monitored constantly by an array of rescue teams—from individuals to the Coast Guard—which used information in rescue efforts. Much of this information was relayed from trapped victims via the SMS functions of their cell phones, to friends and relatives outside the area, who then relayed the information back to NOLA.com. The aggregation of community journalism, user photos and the use of the internet site as a collaborative response to the storm attracted international attention, and was called a watershed moment in journalism.  In the wake of these online-only efforts, the Pulitzer Committee for the first time opened all its categories to online entries.

Restrictions on the media
As the U.S. military and rescue services regained control over the city, there were restrictions on the activity of the media.

On September 9, Lt. Gen. Russel L. Honoré, the military leader of the relief effort, announced that reporters would have "zero access" to efforts to recover bodies in New Orleans. Journalist Brian Williams also reported that in the process of blocking journalists, police even went so far as to threaten reporters with a weapon. However, at refugee centers such as the Houston Astrodome, press activity was extensive. Immediately following the government decision, CNN filed a lawsuit and obtained a temporary restraining order against the federal ban. The next day, spokesperson Col. Christian E. deGraff announced that the government would no longer attempt to bar media access to the victim recovery efforts.

On September 7, KATU journalist Brian Barker reported that his team was threatened with automatic weapons by U.S. Marshals until they were identified by Brig. Gen. Doug Pritt, commander of the 41st Brigade Combat Team of Oregon, the unit they were embedded with. Subsequently, his team taped the letters "TV" on the side of their vehicles in accordance with standard practice in war zones.

Toronto Star staff photojournalist Lucas Oleniuk was thrown to the ground by police in the French Quarter after taking several photographs, including pictures of a firefight between looters and police and the subsequent alleged beating of a looter by the police. The police attempted to take all of his equipment, however he convinced them to just take his camera's memory cards. In a separate incident, freelance photojournalist Marko Georgiev took photos of a body presumably shot and killed by the police. Police then pointed their weapons at the car and ordered the journalists out. They proceeded to search the car and confiscated one of Georgiev's memory cards.

References

External links
transcript of CNN v. Michael Brown suit filed against Federal Emergency Management Agency director Michael D. Brown challenging policy to keep journalists from areas where recovery of the dead was going on.
Archive of newspaper front page images from 8/30/2005, 8/31/2005, 9/1/2005, 9/2/2005, 9/3/2005, and 9/4/2005 from the Newseum.

Hurricane Katrina
Hurricane Katrina
2005 in mass media
Katrina media coverage